Daniel Goodenow (October 30, 1793 – October 7, 1863) was an American politician and jurist from Maine. Goodenow was born in Henniker, New Hampshire and was primarily self-educated, though he did graduate from Dartmouth College. He studied law under future U.S. Senator John Holmes and was admitted to the York County, Maine Bar in 1817. Residing in Alfred, Maine, Goodenow served three one year terms in the Maine House of Representatives (1827, 1828 and 1830), which included a term as Speaker of the Maine House of Representatives. He was a member of the National Republican Party while in the Legislature. In 1831, Goodenow was the National Republican Party candidate for Governor. Unsuccessful, he ran again in 1832 and 1833. In 1838 and 1841, Goodenow served as Maine Attorney General.

On October 10, 1855, Republican Governor Anson Morrill appointed Goodenow to a 7-year term as an associate justice of the Maine Supreme Judicial Court. He retired after his first term ended in 1862 and died in Alfred a year later on October 7, 1863.

References

1793 births
1863 deaths
People from Henniker, New Hampshire
People from Alfred, Maine
Dartmouth College alumni
Maine National Republicans
Maine Whigs
19th-century American politicians
Maine Attorneys General
Justices of the Maine Supreme Judicial Court
19th-century American judges